Hadriania craticulata is a species of sea snail, a marine gastropod mollusk in the family Muricidae, the murex snails or rock snails.

Description
The shell size varies between 20 mm and 45 mm

Distribution
This species occurs in the Mediterranean Sea off Morocco.

References

 Monterosato T. A. (di) (1872 (10 marzo)). Notizie intorno alle conchiglie fossili di Monte Pellegrino e Ficarazzi.. Palermo, Ufficio Tipografico Michele Amenta 44 p
 Vokes E. (1964). Supraspecific groups in the subfamilies Muricinae and Tritonaliinae. Malacologia 2: 1–4
 Coen G. (1933). Saggio di una Sylloge Molluscorum Adriaticorum. Memorie del Regio Comitato Talassografico Italiano 192: pp. i–vii, 1–186

External links
 Gastropods.com : Ocenebra (Hadriania) craticuloides; accessed : 27 November 2010
 MNHN. Paris: Lectotype
 Bucquoy E., Dautzenberg P. & Dollfus G. (1882–1886). Les mollusques marins du Roussillon. Tome Ier. Gastropodes. Paris: Baillière & fils. 570 pp., 66 pls.
 Risso, A. (1826–1827). Histoire naturelle des principales productions de l'Europe Méridionale et particulièrement de celles des environs de Nice et des Alpes Maritimes. Paris, Levrault:. . 3(XVI): 1–480, 14 pls
 Kobelt, W. (1887–1908). Iconographie der schalentragenden europäischen Meeresconchylien. 1: 1–171 pl. 1-28

Ocenebrinae
Gastropods described in 1882